SS M. Michael Edelstein was a Liberty ship built in the United States during World War II. She was named after M. Michael Edelstein, a member of the U.S. House of Representatives from New York's 14th district.

Construction
M. Michael Edelstein was laid down on 28 April 1944, under a Maritime Commission (MARCOM) contract, MC hull 2305, by J.A. Jones Construction, Panama City, Florida; she was sponsored by Mrs. Dorothy Strom, and launched on 5 June 1944.

History
She was allocated to Smith & Johnson Co., on 22 June 1944. On 27 December 1945, she was transferred to the Italian Government, which in turn sold her for $553,253.57 to Tirrenia Societe Italiana di Navigazione, Naples, Italy, for commercial use. She was renamed Milano. After being sold to three more Italian owners she was scrapped in Spezia, Italy, in 1969.

References

Bibliography

 
 
 
 
 

 

Liberty ships
Ships built in Panama City, Florida
1944 ships
Liberty ships transferred to Italy